The Forgotten Daughter is a children's historical novel by Caroline Snedeker. It is set in ancient Rome, where a nobleman's daughter, believed dead, is being raised as the daughter of a slave. The novel, illustrated by Dorothy P. Lathrop, was first published in 1933 and was a Newbery Honor recipient in 1934.

This historic fiction novel is set in 2nd century AD. Roman centurion Laevinius is away when his Greek wife dies giving birth. The child, Chloe, is made a slave and Laevinius is told they both died. Chloe's life is harsh, only brightened by the stories her friend Melissa tells. Chloe's future looks bleak, and her love for a noble Roman seems doomed, until the plague reunites her with her father.

The book has been praised for accurate details that show the culture and everyday life of early Rome.

References

1933 American novels
American children's novels
Children's historical novels
Newbery Honor-winning works
Novels set in ancient Rome
Novels set in the 2nd century BC
1933 children's books
Novels by Caroline Snedeker